Stafford Harry Northcote, Viscount Saint Cyres KStJ (29 August 1869 – 2 February 1926) was an English diplomat and historian.

The only son of Walter Stafford Northcote, 2nd Earl of Iddesleigh and Elizabeth Lucy Meysey-Thompson, he was styled as Viscount Saint Cyres from 1887 until his death. He was educated at Eton and Merton College, Oxford, where he graduated BA with a First in modern history and later MA. He was Secretary and Counsellor in Her Majesty's Diplomatic Service and was also active as a historian. In 1914 he was awarded the honorary degree of Doctor of Literature. He was appointed a Knight of Justice of the Order of St John of Jerusalem and was a Justice of the Peace. In 1922 he was living at 
84, Eaton Square, Belgravia.

On 9 July 1912, Northcote married Dorothy Morrison (born c. 1872), a daughter of Alfred Morrison. They had no children and he died on 2 February 1926 aged 56. His widow survived until 1936.

Selected publications
François de Fénelon (London: Methuen, 1901)
The Gallican Church, The Cambridge Modern History Vol. V (Cambridge University Press, 1908)
Pascal (London: Smith, Elder & Company, 1909; New York: E. P. Dutton)
"The Sorrows of Mrs. Charlotte Smith",  Cornhill Magazine, vol. 15 (1903), pp. 686–96

In popular culture
Northcote is quoted in The Dictionary of Modern Proverbs (Yale, 2012):  “We do not care for things once they are ours; what we enjoy is running after them.”

Notes

1869 births
1926 deaths
Saint Cyres
People educated at Eton College
Alumni of Christ Church, Oxford
19th-century English historians
Heirs apparent who never acceded